Cupressus arizonica, the Arizona cypress, is a North American species of tree in the cypress family Cupressaceae, native to the southwestern United States and Mexico. Populations may be scattered rather than in large, dense stands.

Description
Cupressus arizonica is a coniferous evergreen tree with a conic to ovoid-conic crown. The foliage grows in dense sprays, varying from dull gray-green to bright glaucous blue-green. The leaves are scale-like, 2–5 mm long, and produced on rounded (not flattened) shoots. The seed cones are globose to oblong, 15–33 mm long, with 6 or 8 (rarely 4 or 10) scales, green at first, maturing gray or gray-brown about 20–24 months after pollination. The cones remain closed for many years, only opening after the bearing branch is killed (in a wildfire or otherwise), allowing the seeds to colonize the bare ground exposed by the fire. The male cones are 3–5 mm long, and release pollen in February–March.

Taxonomy
Up to five varieties are distinguished by some botanists, and these are sometimes treated as distinct species:
 Cupressus arizonica var. arizonica, Arizona Cypress – secure. Southern Arizona, southwest New Mexico, south to Durango and Tamaulipas, Chisos Mountains of west Texas.
 Cupressus arizonica var. glabra, Smooth Arizona cypress – secure. Central Arizona.
 Cupressus arizonica var. montana (C. montana), San Pedro Mártir cypress – Vulnerable. Sierra Juárez and San Pedro Mártir pine–oak forests of Northern Baja California.
 Cupressus arizonica var. nevadensis (C. nevadensis), Paiute cypress – Least Concern. Southern California (Kern County and Tulare County).
 Cupressus arizonica var. stephensonii, Cuyamaca cypress – Critically endangered. Southern California (San Diego County). Also known as Hesperocyparis stephensonii (Jespon Manual). Most of this population was burnt in the October 2003 Cedar Fire, though (as expected for a fire-climax species) subsequent regeneration has been good.

Distribution
Cupressus arizonica is found mainly in the southwestern United States (Arizona, Utah, southwestern New Mexico, and southern California, with a few populations in southern Nevada and in the Chisos Mountains of western Texas), and in Mexico (Coahuila, Nuevo León, Chihuahua, Sonora, Durango, Tamaulipas, Zacatecas and northern Baja California). In the wild, the species is often found in small, scattered populations, not necessarily in large forests. An example occurrence is within the Sierra Juárez and San Pedro Mártir pine–oak forests of Mexico, where it is found along with canyon live oak and California fan palm.

Uses
Arizona cypress, particularly the strongly glaucous C. arizonica var. glabra, is widely cultivated as an ornamental tree. Unlike Monterey cypress, it has proved highly resistant to cypress canker, caused by the fungus Seiridium cardinale, and growth is reliable where this disease is prevalent.

The cultivar 'Pyramidalis' has gained the Royal Horticultural Society's Award of Garden Merit (confirmed 2017).

Example of neoendemism and conservation challenges

The ease of hybridization of cypress species in the American southwest has fostered a parallel history of taxonomic disagreements of where genus and species distinctions should apply.  It thus provides a case study of neoendemism in conifers. Close taxonomic relatedness, in turn, offers both challenges and opportunities if and when assisted migration is considered as a mode of climate adaptation to prevent extinctions of endemic cypresses in the American southwest.

References

Further reading

External links

 USDA Plants Profile for Hesperocyparis arizonica (Arizona cypress)
  as Hesperocyparis stephensonii
  as Hesperocyparis stephensonii
 Hike Arizona.com: Photos of Arizona Cypress (Cupressus arizonica)
 

arizonica
Flora of Arizona
Flora of California
Flora of New Mexico
Trees of Coahuila
Trees of Chihuahua (state)
Trees of Sonora
Trees of Durango
Trees of Tamaulipas
Trees of Zacatecas
Trees of Baja California
Flora of Texas
Trees of the South-Central United States
Trees of the Southwestern United States
Flora of the Sierra Madre Occidental
Flora of the Sierra Madre Oriental
Natural history of the Transverse Ranges
Plants described in 1882
Taxa named by Edward Lee Greene
Least concern flora of North America